Gyrton (ancient Greek: Γύρτων) may refer to:

Gyrton (mythology) 
Gyrton (Thessaly), an ancient city

See also
Gyrtona